Father Time is a personification of time. 

Father Time may also refer to:

Fiction
Father Time (DC Comics), a DC Comics supervillain who first appeared in 2006
Father Time (novel), a 2001 Doctor Who novel by Lance Parkin
Father Time (Marvel Comics), a Marvel Comics superhero who first appeared in 1941
Father Time, one of the main characters of YooHoo & Friends (2012 TV series)

Music
Father Time (album), a 2008 album by American country music singer Hal Ketchum
"Father Time", a 1996 single by Stratovarius on the album Episode
 "Father Time", a 1991 song by Richie Sambora from Stranger in This Town
 "Father Time", a 2008 song by Blind Melon from For My Friends
 "Father Time", a 2012 song by Animal Collective from Centipede Hz
 "Father Time", a 2022 song by Kendrick Lamar and Sampha

Other
"Father Time", a 1952 episode of Hallmark Hall of Fame
"Father Time!/Apartnership!", a 2001 episode of The Fairly OddParents
Father Time (Lord's), a weather vane at Lord's Cricket Ground, London